Anatoly Petrov (19 August 1929 – 1 July 2014) was a Soviet athlete. He competed in the men's pole vault at the 1956 Summer Olympics.

References

External links
 

1929 births
2014 deaths
Athletes (track and field) at the 1956 Summer Olympics
Soviet male pole vaulters
Olympic athletes of the Soviet Union
Place of birth missing